Titanoeca tristis is a species of araneomorph spider in the family Titanoecidae. It is found from Europe to Central Asia.

References

Titanoecidae
Spiders of Europe
Spiders of Asia
Spiders described in 1872